Dystebenna is a genus of moths of the family Elachistidae. The genus is mostly placed in the family Elachistidae, but other authors list it as a member of the family Agonoxenidae. It contains only one species Dystebenna stephensi, which is found in Asia and Europe.

Description
The wingspan is 8–9 mm. Adults are on wing from the end of June to September and can be found resting on the trunk of the host tree.

The larvae feed on oak (Quercus species) and chestnut (Castanea species). They feed within the bark, mining their host and preferring mature trees. The larvae can be detected by orange frass on the trunk.

The species overwinters in the pupal stage within the mine.

Distribution
Dystebenna stephensi is found in central Europe, Great Britain, southern Sweden, the Crimea and western Transcaucasia.

References

External links
 

Parametriotinae
Monotypic moth genera
Leaf miners
Moths described in 1849
Moths of Asia
Moths of Europe
Taxa named by Henry Tibbats Stainton